Family for Life is an EP by Primer 55, released independently through Crash Music.

Track listing

Personnel

Musicians 
 J-Sin – vocals
 Bobby Burns – guitar
 Billy Grey – bass
 Preston Nash – drums
 John Stanier – additional drums

References 

2007 EPs
Primer 55 EPs